The Tenley-Friendship Neighborhood Library is a branch of the District of Columbia Public Library in the Tenleytown neighborhood of Washington, D.C. It is located at 4450 Wisconsin Avenue NW. A public library branch first opened in the area in 1926, and a library at the current site opened in 1960.  A redesigned library branch was built at a cost of $18 million  and opened in 2011. The Washington Post described the new library building, which featured a green roof and other sustainable-design features, as "one of the best things for D.C. in decades", though it experienced years of problems with a leaky roof.

References

External links 

 Official website

Public libraries in Washington, D.C.